Bank PHB, formerly known as Platinum Habib Bank, was a commercial bank in Nigeria. The bank was the fifth largest financial services provider in Nigeria.
 The bank's assets were valued in excess of US$6 billion.

Key Officers

Francis Atuche- CEO /MD of Bank PHB

Bank PHB Group
Bank PHB was a member of the Bank PHB Group, headquartered in Lagos, Nigeria, with subsidiaries in the Gambia, Liberia, Nigeria, Sierra Leone and Uganda.

History
Bank PHB was formed in 2005 by the merger between Platinum Bank Plc and Habib Nigeria Bank Plc. Since its inception, the bank pursued a strategy of expansion by the acquisition and creation of subsidiaries within and without its home country of Nigeria. (See Bank PHB Group).

Failure and closure 
On August 5, 2011, the Central Bank of Nigeria revoked the operating licence of BankPHB along with that of Afribank and Spring Bank as they had not shown capacity and ability to recapitalize before the September 30, 2011 recapitalization deadline.

Keystone Bank Limited was created on August 5, 2011, by taking over all the assets (including subsidiaries) and liabilities of the now defunct BankPHB, whose commercial banking license had been revoked on the same day.

See also

Bank PHB Group
List of banks in Nigeria
Orient Bank
Keystone Bank Limited

References

External links
 Bank PHB Homepage
Google Finance listing for Bank PHB

Companies listed on the Nigerian Stock Exchange
Defunct companies based in Lagos
Defunct banks of Nigeria
Banks established in 2005
2011 disestablishments in Nigeria
Banks disestablished in 2011
Nigerian companies established in 2005